Norman Brendon Boone Jr. is an American actor and writer.

Early years
Born in Meridian, Mississippi, Boone is the son of Rev. Norman Boone and Leola Speed Boone. His father was a pastor in the United Methodist Church. Boone was a student at Columbia High School before he graduated from the University of Southern Mississippi. He also had dramatic training at Rollins College for a year.

Career 
On television, Boone portrayed Chief on Garrison's Gorillas and Roman Bedford on Rawhide. He also appeared on other programs, including Gunsmoke; The Red Skelton Show; Bonanza; Gomer Pyle, U.S.M.C.; The Virginian, and other series. He also won a four-day trip to Italy on an episode of The Dating Game. Films in which he appeared include The Big Game (1972), Death Race (1973), and The Hanged Man (1974). On stage, he portrayed Tommy in Tenderloin in Oceanside, California.

Boone wrote a novel, Preacher and Co, and its accompanying screenplay, with a plot focusing on "love, brotherhood, loyalty and redemption".

Personal life 
Boone married Shirley Errington on May 1, 1971, in Jackson, Mississippi, and they had a son.

Recognition 
Boone was nominated for a Golden Globe Award for Actor In A Television Series in 1968. He won the Hollywood Stars of Tomorrow Best Young Actor in a Television Series award for 1967-68 for his work on Garrison's Gorillas.

References 

 
Living people
Year of birth missing (living people)
20th-century American male actors
American male film actors
American male television actors
Male actors from Mississippi